Explorers Club was an American progressive metal/rock supergroup, formed and led by brothers  Trent and Wayne Gardner of Magellan. Explorers Club featured multiple guests, including singer James LaBrie, guitarist John Petrucci and keyboardist Derek Sherinian (of Dream Theater), singer D. C. Cooper (Royal Hunt), drummer Terry Bozzio, bassist Billy Sheehan (UFO, Mr. Big) and guitarists Steve Howe (Yes), Marty Friedman (Megadeth) and James Murphy (Obituary). Their first album, Age of Impact was released to critical praise in 1998, and Raising the Mammoth was released in 2002, to a less favourable critical reception.

Discography

Studio albums 
Age of Impact (1998)
Raising the Mammoth (2002)

References

American progressive metal musical groups
People from Vacaville, California
Heavy metal supergroups
Musical groups established in 1997
Progressive rock musical groups from California